Imagine Sports is a Silicon Valley company founded by CEO Dayne Myers who launched an online game named Total Baseball using Tom Tippett's Diamond Mind Baseball technology. The company was founded as Simnasium, but changed its name to Imagine Sports in May 2007.

History
On August 14, 2006, Diamond Mind Baseball became a wholly owned subsidiary of what was then called Simnasium.  In May 2007, Simnasium announced it would be changing its name to 'Imagine Sports, Inc.'  In December 2009, Imagine Sports became Rob Neyer's Imagine Sports.

External links
Imagine Sports official site
Diamond Mind Baseball official site
Imagine Sports official blog

American sport websites